The Arpa Awards, established in 2002 by the National Academy of Music and Christian Arts, are a ceremony of musical recognition of the work of contemporary Christian music artists, mainly of the Spanish language. The awards are presented each year during an official ceremony in Mexico. Winners receive an Arpa Award, one decides harp shape, a prize forged in bronze, with a weight of 2 kilograms and a height of 33 centimeters in the shape of a harp and a musical note.

History 
The National Academy of Music and Christian Arts (ANMAC) established the Arpa Awards in 2002 for Mexico. In 2003, the ANMAC held the first ceremony in its history in World Trade Center Mexico City. On October 23, 2009, the Arpa Awards celebrate a seventh edition at the National Auditorium of Mexico. On May 21, 2011, the Arpa Awards moved for the first time outside of Mexico and were held at the MACC Center in Miami, United States.

The Arpa Awards recognize artistic or technical merit, not sales or popularity; winners are determined by votes from qualified Academy members. Awarded based on the registrations of members and Christian record companies and the votes of active members of the academy, they serve as an example and inspiration to improve and promote Christian music in Spanish.

Since its foundation, the most winning artists of these awards have been Marcos Witt, Jesús Adrián Romero, Marcos Vidal, Grupo Rojo, Alex Campos, Coalo Zamorano, Danilo Montero, Daniel Calveti, Annette Moreno, Marco Barrientos, Tercer Cielo and Funky.

Category 
The Arpa Awards have 21 categories in 2019:

 Song of the Year
 Solo / Group Release of the Year
 Album of the year
 Live Album
 Classical / Instrumental / Choral Album
 Producer of the Year
 Regional / Tropical Album
 Composer of the Year
 Album of the year
 Male Vocal Album
 Cover design
 Female Vocal Album
 Music video
 Album of the year
 Rock album
 Live Rock Album
 Urban / Alternative Album
 Independent Album
 Songwriter Album
 Song in Participation
 Special Academy Award

References 

Latin music awards
Awards established in 2003
Spanish-language music